Abu Md. Saidur Rahman is a Bangladesh Awami League politician and the former Member of Parliament of Dhaka-1.

Career
Rahman was elected to parliament from Dhaka-1 as a Bangladesh Awami League candidate in 1973.

References

Awami League politicians
Living people
1st Jatiya Sangsad members
Year of birth missing (living people)